This is a list of presidents (Speakers) of the Chamber of Representatives of the Great Khural of Tuva:

Sources

Lists of legislative speakers in Russia
Speakers